English Bay may refer to:

English Bay (Vancouver), British Columbia, Canada
English Bay (neighbourhood)
English Bay, Alaska, United States
English Bay, Anticosti Island, Quebec, Canada (Baie-Sainte-Catherine)
Anse aux Anglais, or English Bay, Rodrigues Island, Mauritius

See also
English Harbour (disambiguation)